Devayani may refer to:
Shukra's daughter, Devayani
A Tamil actress, Devayani (actress)
A French dancer, Devayani (dancer)
A incident, Devyani Khobragade incident